The Portland Timbers–Seattle Sounders rivalry is a soccer rivalry between the Portland Timbers and Seattle Sounders FC, both based in the Pacific Northwest region of the United States. The rivalry originated in the North American Soccer League of the 1970s, with both cities reviving expansion teams, and has carried into lower-level leagues, including the A-League and USL First Division. The rivalry moved to Major League Soccer, the top division of soccer in the United States, in 2011, where it has grown into one of the largest in American soccer.

According to many players, the Seattle–Portland rivalry is one of the only true derbies that is present in American soccer. The rivalry has since grown into one of the largest and most bitter rivalries in American soccer. Alan Hinton, a former English international and ex-Sounders coach, has compared the rivalry to those seen in the English Premier League. It is considered to be one of the most intense rivalries in the United States. In 2018, Matt Pentz of ESPN FC dubbed the derby "MLS' premier rivalry", stating that the "series' longevity lends it an authenticity that no other rivalry in MLS can match."

Seattle and Portland have had rivalries based on various sports teams. A heated rivalry surrounded the Portland Buckaroos and Seattle Totems of the minor-league Western Hockey League in the 1960s. Later, some fans supported the Thunderbirds or Winterhawks hockey teams. This rivalry "naturally translated into soccer" according to one fan. The two cities also had a rivalry between the SuperSonics and Trail Blazers of the NBA, known as the "Battle of I-5", since both cities straddle the Interstate 5 freeway.

History

Overall stats

NASL era
The Seattle Sounders and Portland Timbers first played each other on May 2, 1975; in the Timbers' inaugural game. Seattle defeated Portland 1–0 in front of 8,131 at Portland Civic Stadium, now known as Providence Park. The return match, played on July 26, 1975 saw Portland play spoils and defeat the hosts, Seattle 2-1, in front of a crowd of 27,310. A month later, Portland knocks Seattle out of the playoffs in front of crowd of 31,000.

On June 30, 1979, Seattle defeated Portland 5–1 in the Kingdome in front of a season high 34,000 spectators. Until the 1980s, it would stand as the largest victory in the derby, and is the largest victory by either side in the top tier of American soccer. In the 5–1 victory, Seattle's Derek Smethurst netted a hat trick.

At the end of the 1982 North American Soccer League season, the Portland Timbers franchise was forced to fold, once team expenditures outpaced club income. Consequently, the 1–0 Sounders victory over the Timbers on August 22, 1982 ended up being the final meeting between the two sides in the North American Soccer League. It would not be for nearly 30 years, in 2011, the two sides would meet against one another in the top flight of American soccer.

NASL indoor
In the 1980–81 NASL Indoor season the two clubs faced one another for the first time in indoor soccer. On November 21, 1980 in front of 7,885 at Portland's Memorial Coliseum (now called Veterans Memorial Coliseum), the Timbers won, 6–4. The Sounders would claim victory in the next four meetings. Portland won the final three rivalry matches of 1981–82 indoor, including the teams' last-ever indoor match-up, 6–4, on the strength of Dale Mitchell's hat trick on February 5, 1982.

WSL/WSA era

At the end of the 1983 NASL season, the original Seattle Sounders franchise terminated, with the league itself ceasing operations ahead of the 1985 season. In 1984, a Western Soccer Alliance franchise was granted to the Seattle area for a soccer club in the area that was branded as the Seattle Storm, and went under the F.C. Seattle moniker for a while. The following year, a WSA franchise was also granted to the Portland area, where the rivalry continued through the late 1980s into the early 1990s.

USL

After an 11-year hiatus, the rivalry continued in 2001, when the newly incarnated Portland Timbers hosted the Seattle Sounders on May 11, 2001 at the same stadium where the rivalry began, which was now known as PGE Park. In front of a crowd nearly 12,300, the hosts walked away with a 2–0 victory.

July 21, 2001, former U.S. National Team player, Brian Ching, would score the only goal in 1–0 Sounders victory over the Timbers, as over 11,000 would be in attendance in Portland.

Ahead of the 2004 season, supporters of both the Sounders, Timbers, and their rival up the I-5 corridor, the Vancouver Whitecaps, created the Cascadia Cup which would be given to the supporters whose team had a stronger record against the two sides. The first formal Cascadia Cup match between the two resulted in a Timbers victory, defeating the Sounders 2–0 on May 1, 2004. During the four regular season meetings during that season, the Sounders lost thrice, and had one victory over Portland. However, in the 2004 USL First Division Playoffs, their first playoff meeting since 1975, the Sounders won 3–2 on aggregate over Portland, posting a 2–0 home victory in the second leg.

On September 18, 2005, Seattle knocked Portland out of the playoffs for a second straight year, as Sounders defeated the Timbers 2–0 in Seattle.

In Seattle, Sounders defeated the Timbers 3–1 on July 22, 2006, in a hotly contested match that accumulated eight yellow cards, and one red.

May 10, 2008, in front of over 10,000 at Qwest Field (now CenturyLink Field), Seattle and Portland played out a 0–0 draw in the final match the two teams would play each other in Seattle in the USL-1.

August 7, 2008, the Timbers and Sounders played each other for a final time in the Division 2 league, USL-1.  Seattle defeated Portland 1–0 on the historic night, in front of a rambunctious 12,332 fans. The high intensity match also included a total of six cards handed out, and one ejection.

MLS era

On July 1, 2009, Seattle eliminated Portland 2–1 before a sold-out PGE Park crowd in the U.S. Open Cup. Roger Levesque — a player Portland fans have had a particular dislike for — scored Seattle's first goal within the opening minute. Levesque completed a goal celebration, in which he stood still at the top of the Timbers penalty area while Nate Jaqua pretended to chop him down like a tree, ending with Levesque falling flat on his back.

A cold and rainy night on March 11, 2010, Portland defeated Seattle 1–0 in a preseason community shield charity match. The crowd of 18,606 in attendance that night at Qwest Field is one of the largest crowds to attend a preseason game between two U.S. teams in American soccer history.

In hoping to stoke the rivalry for the future 2011 Major League Soccer season — when the Timbers would be joining the Sounders in MLS — Portland unveiled a billboard displaying a Timbers crest and the words Portland, Oregon and Soccer City USA less than a mile from Qwest Field in Seattle. The billboard was broadcast to a nationwide audience on ESPN2 during halftime of the Sounders home match versus Real Salt Lake that evening.

In March 2011, the Timbers defeated the Sounders 2–0 in the preseason Cascadia Summit, a round robin game event involving the two teams and their Canadian rival, the Vancouver Whitecaps FC. In their first match as both MLS sides, and the first time since 1982 the two played in top division American soccer the Timbers and the Sounders battled to a draw at a rain-soaked Qwest Field in front of 36,593 in the highly anticipated MLS debut of the three-way Cascadia Cup. This was a stadium record crowd to see a regular season MLS match, and included more than 500 traveling Portland fans. The return match, on July 10, 2011 saw Seattle earn a 3–2 road victory.

On October 7, 2012, Seattle hosted Portland at CenturyLink Field in front of 66,452 people, the second-largest stand-alone crowd in MLS history. The Timbers had their second chance of the year to clinch their first Cascadia Cup contested by all three sides, but lost 3–0 to the host Sounders.

In the fourth round of the 2015 U.S. Open Cup, the Sounders hosted the Timbers at the Starfire Sports Complex in Tukwila, Washington. Seattle, the defending champions of the Open Cup, lost 3–1 and ended the match with only six players after three were sent off by the referee with red cards and Obafemi Martins was injured after all three substitutions had been used. The final red card was given to Clint Dempsey for tearing up the notebook of referee Daniel Radford, for which he was suspended an additional three Open Cup matches. The match was later nicknamed the "Red Card Wedding" by fans, a reference to an episode of the television series Game of Thrones.

From 2015 through 2021, either Portland or Seattle represented the MLS Western Conference in the MLS Cup title game. Seattle won two titles, and Portland won one, in addition to winning the 2020 MLS is Back Tournament.

Supporter groups

A bitter rivalry between the teams' supporter groups exists. The Portland Timbers are supported by the Timbers Army, and Seattle Sounders by the Emerald City Supporters.  The spirited groups have always showed a deep amount of resentment toward each other throughout the years. With the close proximity of the two cities, traveling fans of both sides witness hostile environments while visiting the opposing stadium. A rare moment of violence broke out in March 2010 after a preseason Timbers win in Seattle, when, three Sounders fans (who were supposedly not associated with any Sounders supporters group) assaulted a Timbers fan, choking and dragging him with his team scarf.

On March 20, 2009, at the Portland MLS expansion rally, League Commissioner Don Garber mentioned what a great region the Pacific Northwest is for soccer, and gave an example by the success of the new MLS team Seattle Sounders.  However, his comment was met with heavy boos, and jeers coming from the Timbers Army surrounding him.  Portland mayor, Sam Adams, then offered a challenge to the Seattle mayor, for when the Timbers and Sounders meet in 2011.

Attendance

Players and transfers
A large portion of the Sounders-Timbers rivalry can be seen on the soccer field itself. Before Seattle made the jump to MLS, many onfield rivalries between the players existed. As the years progressed, this would only enhance the level of competition, and intensify the matches.  An example of this was the notable rivalry between Timbers defender Scot Thompson and Sounders striker Roger Levesque.  Levesque played in Seattle from 2006-2012, while Thompson played in Portland from 2004 to 2010.

Another reason the rivalry intensified was the transfer of star players between the two teams.  While many players transferred to the other rival city from when the Timbers resumed play in 2001, the most memorable was the signing of Portland's all time assist leader, and fan favorite Hugo Alcaraz-Cuellar to Seattle in 2007.  That same season, Seattle star Andrew Gregor signed with Portland, thus creating tensions on the field, as the players became familiar with each other. While playing for the Sounders in 2003, Gregor had said "A lot of the guys, we know each other from years back, and we don't get along and stuff. It's always exciting."

NASL and USL matches between the teams were intense and more physical than other teams in the leagues. Former Sounders head coach Sigi Schmid said in 2010 that Seattle, Portland, and Vancouver playing in the same league again will be "something that's going to be one of the key features of MLS". The first of these was Seattle fan favorite Mike Fucito who came to Portland via the Montreal Impact on April 20, 2012.

Seattle, then Portland

Portland, then Seattle

Cups

Between 2004 and 2008, the USL Seattle Sounders, Portland Timbers, and Vancouver Whitecaps competed for the supporter created Cascadia Cup, to be awarded to the club who finished with the best record in each season series between the three teams. The Cascadia Cup was created to celebrate the strong rivalries between each of the three clubs. Seattle won the Cascadia Cup twice in this five-year period while Portland never won. Seattle was not involved in the 2009 or 2010 competitions, both of which were won by Portland. While both Seattle and Portland consider Vancouver to be a rival, both of the U.S. fanbases consider their rivalries with Vancouver more cordial than with one another. In a 2011 story on the rivalry by Sports Illustrated writer Grant Wahl, one Timbers Army member said about Vancouver fans, "It's hard to dislike them because they're so nice", and an Emerald City Supporters member added, "They're like the nice cousin that's never going to offend anyone at a party." The MLS versions of the Whitecaps, Sounders and Timbers resumed contesting the Cascadia Cup, beginning with the 2011 season.

Results
For statistical purposes, matches that went to shootouts are counted as draws. Matches ending with a shootout are denoted with an '*'.

NASL era

NASL Indoor

Alliance era

A-League/USL era

MLS era

Notable friendlies

Western Conference standings finishes

• Total: Seattle with 8 higher finishes, Portland with 4.

See also

References

1975 establishments in Oregon
1975 establishments in Washington (state)
Major League Soccer rivalries
Portland Timbers
Seattle Sounders FC
Soccer in Seattle
Sports in Portland, Oregon